This article lists some of the events that took place in the Netherlands in 2013.

Incumbents
Monarch: Beatrix (abdicated, April 30), William-Alexander (ascended April 30)
Prime Minister: Mark Rutte

Events

January
 1: During New Year's Eve in Raard, a woman drives into a group of people, leaving 17 people injured. One of the victims later succumbs to his injuries. 
 10: During the New Year's reception of the umbrella organization of independent financial advisers, 477 attendees pledge the bankers oath for the first time in the presence of minister Dijsselbloem. 
 13: Sven Kramer becomes European ice-skating champion in the man's division and Ireen Wüst becomes champion in the woman's division.
 15: Bob de Vries wins the first marathon on natural ice of 2013 in Noordlaren. Mariska Huisman is the fastest in the woman's division.
 28: Beatrix, incumbent Queen of the Netherlands, announces that on 30 April, she will abdicate in favour of her son William-Alexander.

February
 5: The Sint-Clemenskerk in Nes (on the island Ameland) is destroyed in a fire.

March
 13: Prayer day for crops and labor.
 16: Poker player Ruben Visser wins in season 9 of the European Poker Tour in London; the prize money is £595,000.

April
 21: RTL News exposes a large scale fraud committed by Bulgarians criminals.
 30: Willem-Alexander becomes the new King of the Netherlands, the first male monarch in over 123 years, after his mother's abdication.

May
 6: After two brothers (7 and 9) are reported missing, their father is found dead a day later. The bodies of the two brothers are found on May 19 near a drainage tube in Cothen

June
 8: Journalist Judith Spiegel and her husband Boudewijn Berendsen are abducted in Yemen. They are released on 10 December. 
 11: Led by the SER, an energy deal on the main lines comes to fruition between the political establishment, business community and environmental organizations.

July
 23: In amusement park Walibi Holland, a 10-year-old Israeli girl gets badly injured in a water attraction and loses her foot. 
 25: In both The Netherlands and Belgium, a heatwave breaks out, the first of its kind since July 2006.

August
 4: A 23-year-old Polish man drowns near Callantsoog.
 12: Prince Friso is announced dead due to complications from his skiing accident in 2012.
 23: A 32-year-old Polish man drowns in the Piusharbor, Tilburg.

September
 8: A family tragedy takes place in Schoonloo: A father kills his three sons (10-year-old twins and a two-year-old) and himself.

October
 13:  DierenPark Amersfoort closes its gates for the second time in its history after a severe rainfall. 
 15: Michel van Egmond's book "Gijp" wins the NS Publieksprijs voor het Nederlandse Boek. The book is about former soccer player and pundit René van der Gijp.
 28: Hurricane wind strengths are measured on the island of Vlieland and at Lauwersoog; the heaviest wind thrust is recorded at 152 km/h.

November
 12: The rare northern hawk-owl is spotted in Zwolle. The owl was last seen in 2005. In the previous 100 years, it had only been spotted 3 times.
 30: The Association Council of the AVRO and the Member Council of the TROS approve the merger proposition of the two public broadcasters. Starting 1 January 2014, both will continue as AVROTROS.

December
 2-7: Dutch bishops of the Roman Catholic Church make an ad limina visit to Pope Francis.

Sports

April 3–7: Ellen van Dijk wins the 2013 Energiewacht Tour
July 18–21 Netherlands at the 2013 European Road Championships
Floortje Mackaij wins the silver medal in the Women's junior time trial, the only medal for the Netherlands at the championships. 
July 19 - August 4 Netherlands at the 2013 World Aquatics Championships
The Netherlands wins 1 gold and 3 bronze medals.
August 10–18 Netherlands at the 2013 World Championships in Athletics
The Netherlands wins 1 silver and 1 bronze medal.
September 3–8: Ellen van Dijk wins the 2013 Boels Rental Ladies Tour
September 22–29 Netherlands at the 2013 UCI Road World Championships
The Dutch team wins the medal table at the 2013 UCI Road World Championships in September with 3 gold and 1 silver medal. 
Ellen van Dijk won gold in the Women's time trial, Marianne Vos in the Women's road race and Mathieu van der Poel in the  Men's junior road race.
October 18–20 Netherlands at the 2013 UEC European Track Championships
The Netherlands win 2 gold, 3 silver and 1 bronze medal.
October 20, Wilson Chebet wins the Amsterdam Marathon for the 2nd time in a row.

See also
2013–14 Eredivisie
2012–13 Eerste Divisie
2013–14 KNVB Cup
2013 Johan Cruijff Schaal
Netherlands national football team 2013

Deaths
15 February - Giovanni Narcis Hakkenberg, war hero (b. 1923)
10 June – Saskia Holleman, actress, lawyer and model (b. 1945).

See also
Netherlands in the Eurovision Song Contest 2013
Netherlands in the Junior Eurovision Song Contest 2013
List of Dutch Top 40 number-one singles of 2013
2013 in Dutch television

References

 
Netherlands
Years of the 21st century in the Netherlands
2010s in the Netherlands
Netherlands